Dudley Carleton may refer to:

Dudley Carleton, 1st Viscount Dorchester (1573–1632), English statesman and diplomat
Dudley Carleton (diplomat) (1599–1654), nephew of the above, diplomat and Clerk of the Privy Council
Dudley Carleton, 4th Baron Dorchester (1822–1897), British peer
Dudley Carleton, 2nd Baron Dorchester (1876–1963), British peer